List of Estonian Navy ships is a comprehensive listing of all ships that have been in service to the Estonian Navy.

1918–1940

Destroyers
Lennuk (Izyaslav class)
Wambola (Orfey class)

Torpedo boat
Sulev (A class)

Submarines
Kalev (Kalev class)
Lembit (Kalev class)

Gunboats
Lembit (Gilyak class)
Tasuja (converted icebreaker)
Mardus (auxiliary gunboat)
Meeme (auxiliary gunboat)
Ahti (auxiliary gunboat)
Ilmatar (auxiliary gunboat)
Taara (auxiliary gunboat)
Tartu (auxiliary gunboat)
Uku (auxiliary gunboat)
Vanemuine (auxiliary gunboat)

Patrol boats
Laine (former submarine escort ship)
Pikker (Pikker class)

Minelayers
Ristna (converted paddle steamer)
Suurop (converted paddle steamer)

Minelayers/Minesweepers
Kalev (Teplokhod class, later renamed Keri)
Tahkona (Teplokhod class)
Olev (Teplokhod class, later renamed Vaindlo)
Lehtma (Teplokhod class)

Landing ship
Kalevipoeg (converted passenger ship)

Depot ships
Ingerman
Kotka

1991–present

Patrol ship
 (Beskytteren class)

Minelayers/Support ships
 (Lindormen class)
 (Lindormen class)

Minesweepers
 (Frauenlob class)
 (Frauenlob class)
 (Frauenlob class)

Minehunters
 (Lindau class)
 (Lindau class)
 (Sandown class)
 (Sandown class)
 (Sandown class)

Patrol boats
 (Kondor class)
 (Kondor class)
 (Zhuk class)
 (Zhuk class)
 (Maagen class)
 (R class)
 (R class)
 (NAVY 18 WP class)
 (NAVY 18 WP class)

References

Ships of the Estonian Navy
Estonian military-related lists
Estonia transport-related lists